Nouria Kazdarli, stage name of Khadidja Benaïda (1921 – 9 August 2020) was an Algerian actress. She was one of the largest names in theatre and small screen acting within Algeria.

Biography
Kazdarli was born in Ammi Moussa in 1921 to a family from Matmata, Tunisia. Shortly after her birth, the family moved to Mostaganem. Here, she met Mustapha Bouhrir, who went by the pseudonym of Mustapha Kazdarli, and the couple married in 1939 before settling in Algiers. Mustapha worked for Électricité et gaz d'Algérie while Nouria worked as a seamstress.

Mustapha Kazdarli discovered theatre while in Algiers, where he was introduced to a theatre troupe. Nouria Kazdarli quickly followed him to the troupe, joining him in 1945 while on a tour in Constantine. She adopted her husband's pseudonym of Kazdarli and changed her first name to Nouria, and subsequently asserted herself as a highly important actress.

Nouria Kazdarli died on 9 August 2020 at the age of 99.

References

1921 births
2020 deaths
20th-century Algerian actresses
21st-century Algerian actresses
Algerian people of Tunisian descent
People from Relizane Province